Blue Dart is a Georgia Tech Research Institute project to build an unmanned underwater vehicle, sponsored by the United States Navy.

References

Georgia Tech Research Institute
Robotic submarines
Unmanned underwater vehicles